Vertical position or vertical location is a position along a vertical direction above or below a given vertical datum (reference level).
Vertical distance or vertical separation is the distance between two vertical positions.
Many vertical coordinates exist for expressing vertical position: depth, height, altitude, elevation, etc.
Points lying on an equigeopotential surface are said to be on the same vertical level, as in a water level.

Definitions
The International Organization for Standardization (ISO), more specifically ISO 19111, offers the following two definitions:
 depth: "distance of a point from a chosen reference surface measured downward along a line perpendicular to that surface."
 height: "distance of a point from a chosen reference surface measured upward along a line perpendicular to that surface";
ISO 6709 (2008 version) makes the following additional definition: 
 altitude: "height where the chosen reference surface is mean sea level"

The International Civil Aviation Organization (ICAO) offers similar definitions:
 altitude: "the vertical distance of a level, a point or an object considered as a point, measured from the mean sea level (MSL);"
height: "the vertical distance of a level, a point or an object considered as a point, measured from a specific datum."
ICAO further defines:
 elevation': "the vertical distance of a point or a level, on or affixed to the surface of the earth, measured from mean sea level."
I.e., elevation would be the altitude of the ground or a building.

Derived quantities
Several physical quantities may be defined based on the definitions above:

Depth below seafloor
Depth in a well
Drying height
Dynamic height
Ellipsoidal height
Geocentric altitude
Geopotential
Heights in geodesy
Height above mean sea level
Height above average terrain
Height above ground level
Measured depth
Normal height
Orthometric height
Thickness (geology)
True vertical depth

Units
Vertical distance quantities, such as orthometric height, may be expressed in various units: metres, feet, etc.

Certain vertical coordinates are not based on length, for example, geopotential numbers have units of m2/s2.
Normalization by a constant nominal gravity value (units of m/s2) yields units of metre, as in geopotential height (based on standard gravity) or dynamic height (based on normal gravity at 45 degrees latitude). Despite the dimension, the vertical coordinate still does not represent distance, as would be measured with a ruler.
Sometimes a standard geopotential metre (symbol gpm or m') is introduced for emphasis. However, this practice is not acceptable with the International System of Units (SI): the Guide for the Use of the International System of Units, section 7.5 (Unacceptability of mixing information with units), states that "When one gives the value of a quantity, any information concerning the quantity or its conditions of measurement must be presented in such a way as not to be associated with the unit.".

Another non-SI unit is the vertical metre, introduced when there may be confusion between vertical, horizontal, or slant distances.
It is used for distance climbed during sports such as mountaineering, skiing, hiking, running or cycling
In German-speaking countries the abbreviation 'Hm' for Höhenmeter ("height metre") is used; if it is preceded by a '±' it refers to the cumulative elevation gain.

Measurement
Various instruments and techniques may be used for measuring vertical position:
Altimeter
Bathymetry
Benchmark (surveying)
Depth gauge
Depth sounding
Hypsometer
Topography
Tide gauge
Water level (device)

Phenomena
Many physical phenomena are related to vertical position, as driven by gravity:
Hydraulic head
Stage (hydrology)
Isostasy
Mean sea level
Geoid
Sea surface height
Temperature lapse rate
Terrain
Digital terrain model
Topographic prominence
Vertical displacement
Post-glacial rebound
Subsidence
Tectonic uplift
Vertical pressure variation

See also

Chart datum
Geodesy#Heights
Geographic coordinates
Horizontal position
Hypsometry
Physical geodesy
Vertical and horizontal
Vertical separation (aviation)
Water level

References

Further reading
 IOGP (2018) Geomatics Guidance Note 24: Vertical data in oil and gas applications'', International Association of Oil & Gas Producers (IOGP), Geomatics Committee, Geodesy Subcommittee. Report 373–24, April 2018.

External links